Pramod Tiwari (born 16 July 1952) is an Indian politician from the Indian National Congress party. He is a nine-time Designated  Senior Member of the Legislative Assembly (MLA) from Rampur Khas assembly seat and Former Cabinet Minister in Government of Uttar Pradesh from Pratapgarh of Uttar Pradesh.

Career 
Pramod Tiwari was chosen as a member of Uttar Pradesh Assembly for the first time in the 1980s. He regularly won the Rampur Khas seat. He was the Cabinet Minister in Government of Uttar Pradesh from 1984 to 1991. Tiwari has won nine times in a row.

In 2007 election, Tiwari defeated Kunwar Viggyat Singh of the Samajwadi Party (SP) by a huge margin and in 2012 election, he defeated Hira Madi Patel of Bahujan Samajwadi Party by 31,544 votes.

On 6 June 2012, the Congress removed him as the Congress Legislature Party (CLP) leader and replaced him with Pradeep Mathur, a three-term MLA from Mathura.

Pramod Tiwari was chosen as a member of U.P. Assembly for the first time in the 1980 and won record nine times in a row from Rampur Khas seat in Pratapgarh district. He was the minister of U.P. from 1984 to 1989. He was also the Congress legislature party leader for a record time.

Pramod Tiwari became a Member of Parliament (Rajya Sabha) from Uttar Pradesh in 2012 and served his tenure till 2018,after that he continued his tenure from Rajasthan till 2022 and again in 2022 from Rajasthan .

Record 

Pramod Tiwari entered Guinness Book of World Records for winning Rampur Khas assembly seat for the 9th time in a row.

References

External links
http://www.congresssandesh.com/september-2002/states5.html
Times of India – India against Corruption members picket Congress leader Pramod Tiwari during anti-corruption protest

1951 births
Living people
People from Pratapgarh, Uttar Pradesh
Indian National Congress politicians
Tiwari Pramod